Highway 20, or North Shore Road, is a road on St. John.

Route description 
The route begins at Highway 10 in the center of Cruz Bay. Highway 20 runs along the northern shore of St. John, passing through Virgin Islands National Park. The road serves many popular beaches, including Cinnamon Bay and Trunk Bay. The highway travels along the coast for most of its length, and has several turnouts for scenic overlooks. The roadway begins to bend into the center of the island, in the process passing several small houses and buildings. Highway 20 has one auxiliary route along its length, Highway 206.

Highway 20 has an unusual configuration near its eastern terminus. Near Highway 10, the road splits into two. The northern section, carrying eastbound traffic heads toward the eastern shore, but abruptly ends at an unnumbered road. Traffic wishing to continue on Highway 20 must make a 45 degree turn and continue westbound to meet the other stretch of road. Traffic heading west on Highway 20 simply turns left onto the southern branch and rejoins eastbound traffic a short distance later. This discrepancy causes the mileage of the road to change depending on which direction the road is traveled. After passing through the unusual configuration, the roadway proceeds southeastward. It passes through the center of the island, until its reaches its eastern terminus, an intersection with Highway 10 near the island's south shore.

Major intersections 
The entire route is located on the island of Saint John.

Auxiliary route

Highway 206 (John Head Road) is a road on St. John, USVI. It is an auxiliary route of Highway 20. Running just over a mile from Highway 20 south to Highway 10, the road serves a few residential dwellings and as a connector between the two main roads on St. John.

References

External links

20
1950s establishments in the United States Virgin Islands